Armond Smith (born May 7, 1986) is an American football running back who is currently a free agent.

College football
Smith played college football for Union College in Barbourville, Kentucky.

Professional football

Cleveland Browns
Smith was signed by the Cleveland Browns as an undrafted free agent in 2011.  Smith was first noticed when he ran an 81-yard touchdown in the 2011 preseason against the Detroit Lions.

Carolina Panthers
Smith was ejected from a preseason game against the Baltimore Ravens on August 22, 2013 for the act of kicking second-string linebacker, Albert McClellan in the groin after the whistle.

Toronto Argonauts
On October 14, 2014, Smith signed a practice roster agreement with the Toronto Argonauts of the Canadian Football League. He was released by the Argonauts on November 11, 2014.

References

External links
 Cleveland Browns bio
 Toronto Argonauts bio

1986 births
Living people
American football running backs
Carolina Panthers players
Cleveland Browns players
Union (Kentucky) Bulldogs football players
Sportspeople from DeKalb County, Georgia
Players of American football from Los Angeles
People from Stone Mountain, Georgia
Players of American football from Georgia (U.S. state)
Players of Canadian football from Los Angeles